Below are stand-alone lists of awards and nominations received by American actors.

Many actor biographies have an awards section but these are not linked here.

A 

 Barkhad Abdi
 F. Murray Abraham
 Amy Adams
 Ben Affleck
 Casey Affleck
 Mahershala Ali
 Woody Allen
 Gillian Anderson
 Richard Dean Anderson
 Jennifer Aniston
 Alan Arkin
 Fred Armisen
 Ed Asner
 Awkwafina

B 

 Lauren Bacall
 Alec Baldwin
 Christine Baranski
 Drew Barrymore
 Kim Basinger
 Angela Bassett
 Kathy Bates
 Annette Bening
 Candice Bergen
 Halle Berry
 Beyoncé
 Karen Black
 Alexis Bledel
 Mary J. Blige
 Matt Bomer
 Chadwick Boseman
 Sônia Braga
 Marlon Brando
 Jeff Bridges
 Josh Brolin
 Mel Brooks
 Sterling K. Brown
 Sandra Bullock
 Carol Burnett
 Ellen Burstyn
 Steve Buscemi

C 

 Louis C.K.
 Nicolas Cage
 Steve Carell
 Jim Carrey
 Timothée Chalamet
 Stockard Channing
 Dave Chappelle
 Jessica Chastain
 Don Cheadle
 Cher
 Patricia Clarkson
 George Clooney
 Glenn Close
 Stephen Colbert
 Frances Conroy
 Bradley Cooper
 Bill Cosby
 Kevin Costner
 Bryan Cranston
 James Cromwell
 Marcia Cross
 Tom Cruise
 Billy Crystal
 Jamie Lee Curtis
 Joan Cusack
 Miley Cyrus

D 

 Willem Dafoe
 Matt Damon
 Jeff Daniels
 Paul Dano
 Viola Davis
 Rosario Dawson
 Andra Day
 Doris Day
 Robert De Niro
 Ariana DeBose
 Ellen DeGeneres
 Benicio del Toro
 Johnny Depp
 Laura Dern
 Cameron Diaz
 Leonardo DiCaprio
 Peter Dinklage
 Stanley Donen
 Michael Douglas
 Robert Downey Jr.
 Adam Driver
 Hilary Duff
 Faye Dunaway
 Kirsten Dunst
 Robert Duvall

E 

 Clint Eastwood
 Jesse Eisenberg
 Sam Elliott
 Aunjanue Ellis

F 

 Edie Falco
 Vera Farmiga
 Mia Farrow
 Will Ferrell
 Tina Fey
 Laurence Fishburne
 Jane Fonda
 Jodie Foster
 Sutton Foster
 Megan Fox
 Jamie Foxx
 James Franco
 Dennis Franz
 Morgan Freeman

G 

 James Gandolfini
 Andrew Garfield
 Judy Garland
 Jennifer Garner
 Greta Gerwig
 Paul Giamatti
 Mel Gibson
 Danny Glover
 Donald Glover
 Whoopi Goldberg
 Selena Gomez
 John Goodman
 Joseph Gordon-Levitt
 Kelsey Grammer
 Jake Gyllenhaal

H 

 Gene Hackman
 Tiffany Haddish
 Bill Hader
 Jon Hamm
 Tom Hanks
 Marcia Gay Harden
 Woody Harrelson
 Neil Patrick Harris
 Anne Hathaway
 Ethan Hawke
 Salma Hayek
 Lucas Hedges
 Christina Hendricks
 Taraji P. Henson
 Katharine Hepburn
 Barbara Hershey
 Jonah Hill
 Dustin Hoffman
 Philip Seymour Hoffman
 Bob Hope
 Ron Howard
 Jennifer Hudson
 Kate Hudson
 Helen Hunt
 Anjelica Huston
 David Hyde Pierce

I 

 Oscar Isaac

J 

 Samuel L. Jackson
 Thomas Jane
 Allison Janney
 Scarlett Johansson
 Dakota Johnson
 Angelina Jolie
 Cherry Jones
 James Earl Jones

K 

 Diane Keaton
 Michael Keaton
 Catherine Keener
 Anna Kendrick
 Regina King
 Greg Kinnear
 John Krasinski
 Lisa Kudrow
 Mila Kunis
 Ashton Kutcher

L 

 Shia LaBeouf
 Nathan Lane
 Jessica Lange
 Frank Langella
 Angela Lansbury
 Brie Larson
 Cyndi Lauper
 Jennifer Lawrence
 Cloris Leachman
 Matt LeBlanc
 Jack Lemmon
 Jared Leto
 Juliette Lewis
 Laura Linney
 James Lipton
 John Lithgow
 Lindsay Lohan
 Julia Louis-Dreyfus
 Courtney Love
 Patti LuPone
 Jane Lynch

M 

 Seth MacFarlane
 Shirley MacLaine
 William H. Macy
 Madonna
 Bill Maher
 Rami Malek
 Jena Malone
 Rooney Mara
 Julianna Margulies
 Steve Martin
 Marlee Matlin
 Melissa McCarthy
 Matthew McConaughey
 Audra McDonald
 Frances McDormand
 Idina Menzel
 Laurie Metcalf
 Lea Michele
 Bette Midler
 Liza Minnelli
 Janelle Monáe
 Mo'Nique
 Marilyn Monroe
 Demi Moore
 Julianne Moore
 Mandy Moore
 Mary Tyler Moore
 Rita Moreno
 Chloë Grace Moretz
 Viggo Mortensen
 Elisabeth Moss
 John Mulaney
 Megan Mullally
 Eddie Murphy
 Bill Murray

N 

 Paul Newman
 Jack Nicholson
 Alessandro Nivola
 Edward Norton

O 

 Conan O'Brien
 Bob Odenkirk
 Sandra Oh
 Denis O'Hare
 Jerry Orbach

P 

 Al Pacino
 Elliot Page
 Geraldine Page
 Keke Palmer
 Gwyneth Paltrow
 Sarah Jessica Parker
 Trey Parker
 Sarah Paulson
 Gregory Peck
 Jordan Peele
 Rosie Perez
 Tyler Perry
 Joe Pesci
 Michelle Pfeiffer
 Joaquin Phoenix
 Chris Pine
 Brad Pitt
 Amy Poehler
 Sidney Poitier
 Natalie Portman
 Richard Pryor

Q 

 Queen Latifah

R 

 Sara Ramirez
 Raven-Symoné
 Robert Redford
 John C. Reilly
 Carl Reiner
 Jeremy Renner
 Ryan Reynolds
 Tim Robbins
 Emma Roberts
 Julia Roberts
 Chris Rock
 Sam Rockwell
 Olivia Rodrigo
 Seth Rogen
 Saoirse Ronan
 Paul Rudd
 Mark Ruffalo
 RuPaul
 Winona Ryder

S 

 Safdie brothers
 Adam Sandler
 Susan Sarandon
 Amy Schumer
 Arnold Schwarzenegger
 David Schwimmer
 George C. Scott
 Chloë Sevigny
 Amanda Seyfried
 Tony Shalhoub
 Michael Shannon
 Charlie Sheen
 Martin Sheen
 Blake Shelton
 Sam Shepard
 J. K. Simmons
 Gary Sinise
 Jean Smart
 Will Smith
 Jimmy Smits
 Mira Sorvino
 Sissy Spacek
 Kevin Spacey
 James Spader
 Octavia Spencer
 Sylvester Stallone
 Rod Steiger
 Hailee Steinfeld
 James Stewart
 Jon Stewart
 Kristen Stewart
 Ben Stiller
 Dean Stockwell
 Emma Stone
 Matt Stone
 Sharon Stone
 Meryl Streep
 Elaine Stritch
 Michael Stuhlbarg

T 

 Channing Tatum
 Elizabeth Taylor
 Anya Taylor-Joy
 Charlize Theron
 Tessa Thompson
 Billy Bob Thornton
 Justin Timberlake
 Marisa Tomei
 Lily Tomlin
 Spencer Tracy
 John Travolta
 Stanley Tucci
 Lana Turner
 Cicely Tyson

U 

 Tracey Ullman
 Carrie Underwood
 Gabrielle Union

V 

 Dick Van Dyke

W 

 Mark Wahlberg
 Christopher Walken
 Sela Ward
 Denzel Washington
 Kerry Washington
 Sam Waterston
 Sigourney Weaver
 Forest Whitaker
 Betty White
 Bradley Whitford
 Dianne Wiest
 Kristen Wiig
 Michael K. Williams
 Michelle Williams
 Robin Williams
 Vanessa Williams
 Bruce Willis
 Owen Wilson
 Oprah Winfrey
 Henry Winkler
 Mare Winningham
 Reese Witherspoon
 Evan Rachel Wood
 Alfre Woodard
 Shailene Woodley
 James Woods
 Joanne Woodward
 Robin Wright

Z 

 Renée Zellweger
 Zendaya

 
Awards and nominations received by American actors